The Florida Environmental Research Institute (FERI) is a 501(c)3 not-for-profit, research and education organization located in Tampa, Florida. Founded in 1998, FERI’s initial client was the Department of Defense (DoD) Office of Naval Research (ONR). It was ONR's funding that allowed for the development of the tools to rapidly assess the coastal ocean environment utilizing cutting edge environmental mapping and monitoring techniques, specifically hyperspectral remote sensing. Currently, FERI is responsible for a wide range of tasks spanning from the construction and aerial deployment of several digital sensor systems to the analysis of the data generated by these systems to produce informative and functional maps of U.S. coastal regions.

In 2003 the institute received part of a $4.2 million National Science Foundation grant for a study of pollution in the Hudson River.

In the Fall of 2006, FERI spun off a for profit project focused on the development of an online mapping portal called WeoGeo.

References

External links
FERI Official site

Research institutes in Florida
Remote sensing research institutes
Geographical technology
Buildings and structures in Tampa, Florida
Environmental research institutes
1998 establishments in Florida
Research institutes established in 1998
Geographic data and information organizations in the United States